Afusipa Taumoepeau (pronounced: aff-oo-sip-ah doe-moye-be-ow; born 26 January 1990 in Sydney, New South Wales) is a Tongan rugby union player. Taumoepeau can play at centre or on the wing. He played for the Brumbies 2008–10, and the Melbourne Rebels in 2011.  He currently plays for Perpignan in French Top 14.

Career
Taumoepeau was schooled at St Joseph's College, Hunters Hill and represented Australia at under 20 level, and as part of the Australian Sevens.

He made his debut for the Brumbies in the 2008 Super 14 season, at aged 18. He spent three seasons with the Brumbies. In October 2010 he signed to the Melbourne Rebels and became the Rebels 32nd squad member. Playing in a trial, in preparation for the 2011 Super Rugby season in a pre-season match against Tonga at Olympic Park, Taumoepeau scored a try and earned the honour of scoring the Rebels' first ever pre-season points.

In 2011 he joined French team Pau in the French second division (Pro D2) where he stayed 3 years. He then signed for Albi in the same division for 2 years. In 2016 he joined Castres, in the French Top 14 league. On 2 June 2018 he became a Top 14 champion, Castres beating Montpellier in the final. On 5 June he joined Perpignan, still in the Top 14, for a 3 year contract.

He is not the only one involved with rugby in his family. He has an older brother, Pauliasi Taumoepeau  who captained both the St Joseph's College 1st XV and Australian Schoolboys in 2004 and who later played for Eastern Suburbs Rugby Union in Sydney.

Taumoepeau made his test debut for Tonga on 7 November 2021 as part of a 69-3 loss to England during the 2021 Autumn Nations Series

Honours

Club 
 Castres
Top 14: 2017–18

References

External links
 

Australian rugby union players
Tongan rugby union players
Tonga international rugby union players
Living people
Rugby union players from Sydney
1990 births
Melbourne Rebels players
ACT Brumbies players
Rugby union centres
Expatriate rugby union players in France
Australian expatriate sportspeople in France
Australian expatriate rugby union players
Australian sportspeople of Tongan descent
Section Paloise players
SC Albi players
Castres Olympique players
USA Perpignan players
Rugby union wings